In Judaism, the concept of the Jews as the chosen people ( ha-ʿam ha-nivḥar , IPA: haʕam hanivħar) is the belief that the Jews, via descent from the ancient Israelites, are the chosen people, i.e. selected to be in a covenant with God. The idea of the Israelites being chosen by God is found most directly in the Book of Deuteronomy as the verb baḥar (בָּחַר), and is alluded to elsewhere in the Hebrew Bible using other terms such as "holy people". Much is written about these topics in rabbinic literature. The three largest Jewish denominations—Orthodox Judaism, Conservative Judaism and Reform Judaism—maintain the belief that the Jews have been chosen by God for a purpose. Sometimes this choice is seen as charging the Jewish people with a specific mission—to be a light unto the nations, and to exemplify the covenant with God as described in the Torah.

While the concept of "chosenness" may be understood by some to connote ethnic supremacy, the status as a "chosen people" within Judaism does not preclude a belief that God has a relationship with other peoples—rather, Judaism holds that God had entered into a covenant with all humankind, and that Jews and non-Jews alike have a relationship with God. Biblical references as well as rabbinic literature support this view: Moses refers to the "God of the spirits of all flesh", the Tanakh (Hebrew Bible) also identifies prophets outside the community of Israel and the prophet Yonah (Jonah) is explicitly told to go prophesize to the non-Jewish people of Nineveh. Based on these statements and stories, some rabbis theorized that, in the words of Natan'el al-Fayyumi, a Yemenite Jewish theologian of the 12th century, "God permitted to every people something he forbade to others ... [and] God sends a prophet to every people according to their own language." (Levine, 1907/1966) The Mishnah states that "Humanity was produced from one man, Adam, to show God's greatness. When a man mints a coin in a press, each coin is identical. But when the King of Kings, the Holy One, blessed be He, creates people in the form of Adam not one is similar to any other" (Mishnah Sanhedrin 4:5). The Tosefta, an important supplement to the Mishnah, also states: "Righteous people of all nations have a share in the world to come" (Sanhedrin 105a).

According to the Israel Democracy Institute, approximately two thirds of Israeli Jews believe that Jews are the "chosen people".

In the Bible
According to Deuteronomy, when the Lord delivers the Israelites to the land, the other nations will be cast out, and "thou shalt make no covenant with them, nor show mercy unto them" Deuteronomy 7:4-7:5,
 "But thus shall ye deal with them; ye shall destroy their altars, and break down their images, and cut down their groves, and burn their graven images with fire. For thou art a holy people unto the Lord thy God: the Lord thy God hath chosen thee to be a special people unto himself, above all people that are upon the face of the earth".

A similar passage exalting Israel as the chosen people follows prohibitions on baldness and cutting yourself in mourning, "For thou art a holy people".

The Torah also says,
"Now therefore, if you will obey my voice indeed, and keep my covenant, then you shall be a peculiar treasure unto me from all the peoples, for all the earth is mine."
God promises that he will never exchange his people with any other:
"And I will establish My covenant between Me and you and your descendants after you in their generations, for an everlasting covenant, to be God to you and your descendants after you."

Other Torah verses about chosenness,
"And you shall be unto me a kingdom of priests, and a holy nation"
"The Lord did not set his love upon you, nor choose you, because you were more in number than any people; for you were the fewest of all people; but because the Lord loved you, and because he would keep the oath which he had sworn unto your ancestors."

The obligation imposed upon the Israelites was emphasized by the prophet Amos:
"You only have I singled out of all the families of the earth: therefore will I visit upon you all your iniquities."

Rabbinic views
Sometimes this choice is seen as charging the Jewish people with a specific mission—to be a light unto the nations, and to exemplify the covenant with God as described in the Torah.  This view, however, does not always preclude a belief that God has a relationship with other peoples—rather, Judaism held that God had entered into a covenant with all humankind, and that Jews and non-Jews alike have a relationship with God.
Biblical references as well as rabbinic literature support this view:  Moses refers to the "God of the spirits of all flesh", and the Tanakh also identifies prophets outside the community of Israel.  Based on these statements, some rabbis theorized that, in the words of Natan'el al-Fayyumi, a Yemenite Jewish theologian of the 12th century, "God permitted to every people something he forbade to others...[and] God sends a prophet to every people according to their own language." The Mishnah states that "Humanity was produced from one man, Adam, to show God's greatness. When a man mints a coin in a press, each coin is identical. But when the King of Kings, the Holy One, blessed be He, creates people in the form of Adam not one is similar to any other." The Tosefta, a collection of important post-Talmudic discourses, also states: "Righteous people of all nations have a share in the world to come."

Most Jewish texts do not state that "God chose the Jews" by itself. Rather, this is usually linked with a mission or purpose, such as proclaiming God's message among all the nations, even though Jews cannot become "unchosen" if they shirk their mission. This implies a special duty, which evolves from the belief that Jews have been pledged by the covenant which God concluded with the biblical patriarch Abraham, their ancestor, and again with the entire Jewish nation at Mount Sinai. In this view, Jews are charged with living a holy life as God's priest-people.

In the Jewish prayerbook (the Siddur), chosenness is referred to in a number of ways. The blessing for reading the Torah reads, "Praised are You, Lord our God, King of the Universe, Who has chosen us out of all the nations and bestowed upon us His Torah." In the "Kiddush", a prayer of sanctification, in which the Sabbath is inaugurated over a cup of wine, the text reads, "For you have chosen us and sanctified us out of all the nations, and have given us the Sabbath as an inheritance in love and favour. Praised are you, Lord, who hallows the Sabbath." In the "Kiddush" recited on festivals it reads, "Blessed are You ... who have chosen us from among all nations, raised us above all tongues, and made us holy through His commandments." The Aleinu prayer refers to the concept of Jews as a chosen people: "It is our duty to praise the Master of all, to exalt the Creator of the Universe, who has not made us like the nations of the world and has not placed us like the families of the earth; who has not designed our destiny to be like theirs, nor our lot like that of all their multitude. We bend the knee and bow and acknowledge before the Supreme King of Kings, the Holy One, blessed be he, that it is he who stretched forth the heavens and founded the earth. His seat of glory is in the heavens above; his abode of majesty is in the lofty heights.

Further interpretations
The following section contains information from the Jewish Encyclopedia, originally published between 1901–1906, which is in the public domain.

According to the Rabbis, "Israel is of all nations the most willful or headstrong one, and the Torah was to give it the right scope and power of resistance, or else the world could not have withstood its fierceness."

"The Lord offered the Law to all nations; but all refused to accept it except Israel."

How do we understand "A Gentile who consecrates his life to the study and observance of the Law ranks as high as the high priest", says R. Meïr, by deduction from Lev. xviii. 5; II Sam. vii. 19; Isa. xxvi. 2; Ps. xxxiii. 1, cxviii. 20, cxxv. 4, where all stress is laid not on Israel, but on man or the righteous one.

Maimonides states: It is now abundantly clear that the pledges Hashem made to Avraham and his descendants would be fulfilled exclusively first in Yitzchak and then in Yaakov, Yitzchak son. This is confirmed by a passage that states, "He is ever mindful of His covenant ... that He made with Avraham, swore to Yitzchak, and confirmed in a decree for Yaakov, for Yisrael, as an eternal covenant."

The Gemara states this regarding a non-Jew who studies Torah [his 7 mitzvot] and regarding this, see Shita Mekubetzes, Bava Kama 38a who says that this is an exaggeration. In any case, this statement was not extolling the non-Jew. The Rishonim explain that it is extolling the Torah.

Tosfos explains that it uses the example of a kohen gadol (high priest), because this statement is based on the verse, "y'kara hi mipnimim" (it is more precious than pearls). This is explained elsewhere in the Gemara to mean that the Torah is more precious pnimim (translated here as "inside" instead of as "pearls"; thus that the Torah is introspectively absorbed into the person), which refers to lifnai v'lifnim (translated as "the most inner of places"), that is the Holy of Holies where the kahon gadol went.

In any case, in Midrash Rabba this statement is made with an important addition: a non-Jew who converts and studies Torah etc.

The Nation of Israel is likened to the olive. Just as this fruit yields its precious oil only after being much pressed and squeezed, so Israel's destiny is one of great oppression and hardship, in order that it may thereby give forth its illuminating wisdom. Poverty is the quality most befitting Israel as the chosen people. Only on account of its good works is Israel among the nations "as the lily among thorns", or "as wheat among the chaff."

Modern Orthodox views
Rabbi Lord Immanuel Jakobovits, former Chief Rabbi of the United Synagogue of Great Britain (Modern Orthodox Judaism), described chosenness in this way: "Yes, I do believe that the chosen people concept as affirmed by Judaism in its holy writ, its prayers, and its millennial tradition. In fact, I believe that every people—and indeed, in a more limited way, every individual—is "chosen" or destined for some distinct purpose in advancing the designs of Providence. Only, some fulfill their mission and others do not. Maybe the Greeks were chosen for their unique contributions to art and philosophy, the Romans for their pioneering services in law and government, the British for bringing parliamentary rule into the world, and the Americans for piloting democracy in a pluralistic society. The Jews were chosen by God to be 'peculiar unto Me' as the pioneers of religion and morality; that was and is their national purpose."

Modern Orthodox theologian Michael Wyschogrod wrote:

"[T]he initial election of Abraham himself was not earned.  ... We are simply told that God commanded Abraham to leave his place of birth and go to a land that God would show him.  He is also promised that his descendants will become a numerous people.  But nowhere does the Bible tell us why Abraham rather than someone else was chosen.  The implication is that God chooses whom He wishes and that He owes no accounting to anyone for His choices."

Rabbi Norman Lamm, a leader of Modern Orthodox Judaism, wrote: "The chosenness of Israel relates exclusively to its spiritual vocation embodied in the Torah; the doctrine, indeed, was announced at Sinai. Whenever it is mentioned in our liturgy—such as the blessing immediately preceding the Shema....it is always related to Torah or Mitzvot (commandments). This spiritual vocation consists of two complementary functions, described as "Goy Kadosh", that of a holy nation, and "Mamlekhet Kohanim", that of a kingdom of priests. The first term denotes the development of communal separateness or differences in order to achieve a collective self-transcendence. ... The second term implies the obligation of this brotherhood of the spiritual elite toward the rest of mankind; priesthood is defined by the prophets as fundamentally a teaching vocation."

Conservative views

Conservative Judaism views the concept of chosenness in this way: "Few beliefs have been subject to as much misunderstanding as the 'Chosen People' doctrine.  The Torah and the Prophets clearly stated that this does not imply any innate Jewish superiority.  In the words of Amos (3:2) 'You alone have I singled out of all the families of the earth—that is why I will call you to account for your iniquities.' The Torah tells us that we are to be "a kingdom of priests and a holy nation" with obligations and duties which flowed from our willingness to accept this status. Far from being a license for special privilege, it entailed additional responsibilities not only toward God but to our fellow human beings. As expressed in the blessing at the reading of the Torah, our people have always felt it to be a privilege to be selected for such a purpose. For the modern traditional Jew, the doctrine of the election and the covenant of Israel offers a purpose for Jewish existence which transcends its own self interests. It suggests that because of our special history and unique heritage we are in a position to demonstrate that a people that takes seriously the idea of being covenanted with God can not only thrive in the face of oppression, but can be a source of blessing to its children and its neighbors. It obligates us to build a just and compassionate society throughout the world and especially in the land of Israel where we may teach by example what it means to be a 'covenant people, a light unto the nations.'"

Rabbi Reuven Hammer comments on the excised sentence in the Aleinu prayer mentioned above:

"Originally the text read that God has not made us like the nations who "bow down to nothingness and vanity, and pray to an impotent god", ... In the Middle Ages these words were censored, since the church believed they were an insult to Christianity. Omitting them tends to give the impression that the Aleinu teaches that we are both different and better than others. The actual intent is to say that we are thankful that God has enlightened us so that, unlike the pagans, we worship the true God and not idols. There is no inherent superiority in being Jewish, but we do assert the superiority of monotheistic belief over paganism. Although paganism still exists today, we are no longer the only ones to have a belief in one God."

Reform views
Reform Judaism views the concept of chosenness as follows: "Throughout the ages it has been Israel's mission to witness to the Divine in the face of every form of paganism and materialism. We regard it as our historic task to cooperate with all men in the establishment of the kingdom of God, of universal brotherhood, Justice, truth and peace on earth. This is our Messianic goal." In 1999 the Reform movement stated, "We affirm that the Jewish people are bound to God by an eternal covenant, as reflected in our varied understandings of Creation, Revelation and Redemption. ... We are Israel, a people aspiring to holiness, singled out through our ancient covenant and our unique history among the nations to be witnesses to God's presence. We are linked by that covenant and that history to all Jews in every age and place."

Alternative views

Equality of souls

Many Kabbalistic sources, notably the Tanya, contain statements to the effect that the Jewish soul is qualitatively different from the non-Jewish soul.  A number of known Chabad rabbis offered alternative readings of the Tanya, did not take this teaching literally, and even managed to reconcile it with the leftist ideas of internationalism and class struggle. The original text of the Tanya refers to the "idol worshippers" and does not mention the "nations of the world" at all, although such interpretation was endorsed by Menachem Mendel Schneerson and is popular in contemporary Chabad circles. Hillel of Parich, an early Tanya commentator, wrote that the souls of righteous Gentiles are more similar to the Jewish souls, and are generally good and not egoistic. This teaching was accepted by Schneerson and is considered normative in Chabad.

Different in character but not different in value
According to the author of the Tanya himself, a righteous non-Jew can achieve a high level of spiritually, similar to an angel, although his soul is still fundamentally different in character, but not value, from a Jewish one. Tzemach Tzedek, the third rebbe of Chabad, wrote that the Muslims are naturally good-hearted people. Rabbi Yosef Jacobson, a popular contemporary Chabad lecturer, teaches that in today's world most non-Jews belong to the category of righteous Gentiles, effectively rendering the Tanya's attitude anachronistic.

Altruism
An anti-Zionist interpretation of Tanya was offered by Abraham Yehudah Khein, a prominent Ukrainian Chabad rabbi, who supported anarchist communism and considered Peter Kropotkin a great Tzaddik. Khein basically read the Tanya backwards; since the souls of idol worshipers are known to be evil, according to the Tanya, while the Jewish souls are known to be good, he concluded that truly altruistic people are really Jewish, in a spiritual sense, while Jewish nationalists and class oppressors are not. By this logic, he claimed that Vladimir Solovyov and Rabindranath Tagore probably have Jewish souls, while Leon Trotsky and other totalitarians do not, and many Zionists, whom he compared to apes, are merely "Jewish by birth certificate".

Righteous non-Jews
Nachman of Breslov also believed that Jewishness is a level of consciousness, and not an intrinsic inborn quality. He wrote that, according to the Book of Malachi, one can find "potential Jews" among all nations, whose souls are illuminated by the leap of "holy faith", which "activated" the Jewishness in their souls. These people would otherwise convert to Judaism, but prefer not to do so. Instead, they recognize the Divine unity within their pagan religions.

Isaac Arama, an influential philosopher and mystic of the 15th century, believed that righteous non-Jews are spiritually identical to the righteous Jews. Rabbi Menachem Meiri, a famous Catalan Talmudic commentator and Maimonidian philosopher, considered all people, who sincerely profess an ethical religion, to be part of a greater "spiritual Israel". He explicitly included Christians and Muslims in this category. Meiri rejected all Talmudic laws that discriminate between the Jews and non-Jews, claiming that they only apply to the ancient idolators, who had no sense of morality. The only exceptions are a few laws related directly or indirectly to intermarriage, which Meiri did recognize.

Meiri applied his idea of "spiritual Israel" to the Talmudic statements about unique qualities of the Jewish people. For example, he believed that the famous saying that Israel is above astrological predestination (Ein Mazal le-Israel) also applied to the followers of other ethical faiths. He also considered countries, inhabited by decent moral non-Jews, such as Languedoc, as a spiritual part of the Holy Land.

Spinoza

One Jewish critic of chosenness was the philosopher Baruch Spinoza. In the third chapter of his Theologico-Political Treatise, Spinoza mounts an argument against a naive interpretation of God's choice of the Jews. Bringing evidence from the Bible itself, he argues that God's choice of Israel was not unique (he had chosen other nations before choosing the Hebrew nation) and that the choice of the Jews is neither inclusive (it does not include all of the Jews, but only the 'pious' ones) nor exclusive (it also includes 'true gentile prophets'). Finally, he argues that God's choice is not unconditional. Recalling the numerous times God threatened the complete destruction of the Hebrew nation, he asserts that this choice is neither absolute, nor eternal, nor necessary.

Einstein
In a German-language letter to philosopher Eric Gutkind, dated 3 January 1954, the physicist Albert Einstein wrote:
The word God is for me nothing more than the expression and product of human weaknesses, the Bible a collection of honorable, but still primitive legends which are nevertheless pretty childish. No interpretation no matter how subtle can (for me) change this.... For me the Jewish religion like all other religions is an incarnation of the most childish superstitions. And the Jewish people to whom I gladly belong and with whose mentality I have a deep affinity have no different quality for me than all other people.... I cannot see anything “chosen” about them.

Reconstructionist criticism
Reconstructionist Judaism rejects the concept of chosenness. Its founder, Rabbi Mordecai Kaplan, said that the idea that God chose the Jewish people leads to racist beliefs among Jews, and thus must be excised from Jewish theology. This rejection of chosenness is made explicit in the movement's siddurim (prayer books).  For example, the original blessing recited before reading from the Torah contains the phrase, "asher bahar banu mikol ha’amim"—"Praised are you Lord our God, ruler of the Universe, who has chosen us from among all peoples by giving us the Torah."  The Reconstructionist version is rewritten as "asher kervanu la’avodato", "Praised are you Lord our God, ruler of the Universe, who has drawn us to your service by giving us the Torah." In the mid-1980s, the Reconstructionist movement issued its Platform on Reconstructionism. It states that the idea of chosenness is "morally untenable", because anyone who has such beliefs "implies the superiority of the elect community and the rejection of others."

Not all Reconstructionists accept this view.  The newest siddur of the movement, Kol Haneshamah, includes the traditional blessings as an option, and some modern Reconstructionist writers have opined that the traditional formulation is not racist, and should be embraced.

An original prayer book by Reconstructionist feminist poet Marcia Falk, The Book of Blessings, has been widely accepted by both Reform and Reconstructionist Jews. Falk rejects all concepts relating to hierarchy or distinction; she sees any distinction as leading to the acceptance of other kinds of distinctions, thus leading to prejudice. She writes that as a politically liberal feminist, she must reject distinctions made between men and women, homosexuals and heterosexuals, Jews and non-Jews, and to some extent even distinctions between the Sabbath and the other six days of the week. She thus rejects the idea of chosenness as unethical. She also rejects Jewish theology in general, and instead holds to a form of religious humanism. Falk writes: "The idea of Israel as God's chosen people ... is a key concept in rabbinic Judaism. Yet it is particularly problematic for many Jews today, in that it seems to fly in the face of monotheistic belief that all humanity is created in the divine image—and hence, all humanity is equally loved and valued by God. ... I find it difficult to conceive of a feminist Judaism that would incorporate it in its teaching: the valuing of one people over and above others is all too analogous to the privileging of one sex over another." Reconstructionist author Judith Plaskow also criticises the idea of chosenness, for many of the same reasons as Falk. A politically liberal lesbian, Plaskow rejects most distinctions made between men and women, homosexuals and heterosexuals, and Jews and non-Jews. In contrast to Falk, Plaskow does not reject all concepts of difference as inherently leading to unethical beliefs, and holds to a more classical form of Jewish theism than Falk.

A number of responses to these views have been made by Reform and Conservative Jews; they hold that these criticisms are against teachings that do not exist within liberal forms of Judaism, and which are rare in Orthodox Judaism (outside certain Haredi communities, such as Chabad). A separate criticism stems from the very existence of feminist forms of Judaism in all denominations of Judaism, which do not have a problem with the concepts of chosenness.

Views of other religions

Islam

The children of Israel enjoy a special status in the Islamic book, the Quran (2:47 and 2:122). However, Muslim scholars point out that this status did not confer upon Israelites any racial superiority, and was only valid so long as the Israelites maintain their covenant with God.

Christianity

Some Christians believe that the Jews were God's chosen people, but because of Jewish Rejection of Jesus, the Christians in turn received that special status. This doctrine is known as Supersessionism.

Other Christians, such as the Christadelphians, believe that God has not rejected Israel as his chosen people and that the Jews will in fact accept Jesus as their Messiah at his Second Coming, resulting in their salvation.

Augustine criticized Jewish chosenness as "carnal." He reasoned that Israel was chosen "according to the flesh."

Influence on Judaism's relationship with other religions
Avi Beker, an Israeli scholar and former Secretary General of the World Jewish Congress, regarded the idea of the chosen people as Judaism's defining concept and "the central unspoken psychological, historical, and theological problem which is at the heart of Jewish-Gentile relations." In his book The Chosen: The History of an Idea, and the Anatomy of an Obsession, Beker expresses the view that the concept of chosenness is the driving force behind Jewish-Gentile relations, explaining both the admiration and, more pointedly, the envy and the hatred which the world has felt towards the Jews in both religious and secular terms. Beker argues that while Christianity has modified its doctrine on the displacement of the Jews, Islam has neither reversed nor reformed its theology concerning the succession of both the Jews and the Christians. According to Beker, this presents a major barrier to conflict resolution in the Arab-Israeli conflict.

Ethnocentrism
The Israeli philosopher Ze'ev Levy writes that chosenness can be "(partially) justified only from the historical angle" with respect to its spiritual and moral contribution to Jewish life through the centuries as "a powerful agent of consolation and hope". He points out, however, that modern anthropological theories "do not merely proclaim the inherent universal equality of all people [as] human beings; they also stress the equivalence [emphasis in original] of all human cultures." He continues that "there are no inferior and superior people or cultures but only different, other, ones." He concludes that the concept of chosenness entails ethnocentrism, "which does not go hand in hand with otherness, that is, with unconditional respect of otherness".

Some people have claimed that Judaism's chosen people concept is racist because it implies that Jews are superior to non-Jews. The Anti-Defamation League asserts that the concept of a chosen people within Judaism has nothing to do with racial superiority.

See also
 Religious nationalism
 Supersessionism

Notes

References
 Emet Ve-Emunah: Statement of Principles of Conservative Judaism, JTSA, New York, 1988, p. 33–34
 Platform on Reconstructionism Federation of Reconstructionist Congregations and Havurot, September 1986, pages D, E
 Statement of Principles for Reform Judaism, 1999 Pittsburgh convention of the Central Conference of American Rabbis
 Encyclopaedia Judaica, Keter Publishing
 Ismar Elbogen Jewish Liturgy: A Comprehensive History JPS, 1993. The most thorough academic study of the Jewish liturgy ever written.
 Marcia Falk The Book of Blessings Harper San Francisco, 1996
 Reuven Hammer, Ed. Or Hadash: A Commentary on Siddur Sim Shalom for Shabbat and Festivals, The Rabbinical Assembly, 2003
 Nosson Scherman, Ed. The Complete Artscroll Siddur, Mesorah Publications, 2nd edition, 1986

Further reading
 
  (Part 1. Chosenness)

External links
The Contemporary Rivalry over the Chosen People: Jewish, Christian, and Muslim Perspectives – Avi Beker  at the Institute for Global Jewish Affairs
Chosen people at the Jewish Encyclopedia
Beliefs of Reform Judaism
The Jewish concept of chosenness
When God Wanted to Destroy the Chosen People, Dr Gili Kugler
The Chosen People FAQs
Some are Chosen, All are Loved. Rabbi Gilbert S. Rosenthal
The Chosen People: Reclaiming Our Sacred Myth, Mitchell Max
How does Jewish Pride differ from Nazi Supremacy?, Rabbi Tzvi Freeman
Anti-Defamation League paper on Christian Identity
The Covenant, the Sword, and the Arm of the Lord – a Christian Identity movement 
The Real Truth About The Talmud by Rabbi Gil Student. Exposes fraudulent or distorted Talmud quotes used by antisemites
Are the Jews the Chosen People? chabad.org
OzTorah – Isn't it arrogant and exclusionist for Jews to regard themselves as the Chosen People?

Jewish theology